Henschel & Son was a German company, located in Kassel, best known during the 20th century as a maker of transportation equipment, including locomotives, trucks, buses and trolleybuses, and armoured fighting vehicles and weapons.

Georg Christian Carl Henschel founded the factory in 1810 at Kassel. His son Carl Anton Henschel founded another factory in 1837. In 1848, the company began manufacturing locomotives. The factory became the largest locomotive manufacturer in Germany by the 20th century. Henschel built 10 articulated steam trucks, using Doble steam designs, for Deutsche Reichsbahn railways as delivery trucks. Several cars were built as well, one of which became Hermann Göring's staff car. In 1918, Henschel began the production of gearboxes at the Kassel plant. In January 1925, Henschel & Son began building trucks and buses.

World War II

Early in 1935, Henschel began manufacturing Panzer I tanks. During World War II, the firm was responsible for license production of the Dornier Do 17Z medium bomber, and in 1939–1940 it began large-scale production of the Panzer III. Henschel was the sole manufacturer of the Tiger I, and alongside Porsche the Tiger II. In 1945, the company had 8,000 workers working in two shifts each of 12 hours, and forced labour was used extensively. The company's factories, which also manufactured narrow-gauge locomotives, were among the most important Allied bomber targets and were nearly completely destroyed.

Aviation
Henschel Flugzeugwerke aircraft and missiles included:
Henschel Hs 117 Schmetterling (Butterfly), rocket-engined surface-to-air missile 
Henschel Hs 121, fighter and trainer (prototype)
Henschel Hs 122, army co-operation/reconnaissance
Henschel Hs 123, ground-attack (biplane)
Henschel Hs 124, heavy fighter and bomber (prototype)
Henschel Hs 125, fighter and trainer (prototype)
Henschel Hs 126, reconnaissance
Henschel Hs 127, fast medium bomber (Schnellbomber prototype)
Henschel Hs 128, high-altitude reconnaissance and bomber (prototypes) 
Henschel Hs 129, ground-attack
Henschel Hs 130, high altitude reconnaissance and bomber (prototypes)
Henschel Hs 132, jet-engined dive bomber (prototype)
Henschel Hs 135, delta wing
Henschel Hs 293, rocket-boosted glide bomb 
Henschel Hs 294, rocket-powered anti-shipping glide bomb 
Henschel Hs 295
Henschel Hs 296
Henschel Hs 297 Föhn, 73mm anti-aircraft rocket-launcher
Henschel Hs 298, rocket-powered air-to-air missile
Henschel Hs P.75, a 1941 design with slightly swept-back wings placed at the rear, swept-back canards at the front, and double pusher propellers at the rear.
Henschel Hs P.87, a Schnellbomber design similar to the Hs P.75, except that the canards in the front are straight and the wing is curved.
Henschel 'Zitterrochen' (Torpedofish), air-to-surface missile (pre-production only)

Post-war business

Manufacturing began again in 1948. In 1964, the company took over Rheinische Stahlwerke and became Rheinstahl Henschel AG (Hanomag). The truck production of Henschel was merged with that of Hanomag that spun off to form Hanomag-Henschel in 1969, this later went to Daimler-Benz, which discontinued the brand name Hanomag-Henschel in 1974. The production was switched to commercial vehicle axles, in this area it is the largest factory in Europe. In 1976 Thyssen-Henschel, and 1990 ABB Henschel AG. In 1996, the company became ABB Daimler Benz Transportation Adtranz. The company was subsequently acquired by Bombardier (Canada) around 2002. The Kassel facility still exists and is one of the world's largest manufacturers of locomotives (Henschel Antriebstechnik).

Locomotives

Private, mining and industry railways

Generation 1
 Henschel DH 110
 Henschel DH 200
 Henschel DH 360
 Henschel DH 550

Generation 2
 Henschel DH 240
 Henschel DH 360
 Henschel DH 390
 Henschel DH 440
 Henschel DH 630
 Henschel DH 875
 Henschel DHG 630
 Henschel DH 500
 Henschel DH 500

Generation 3
 Henschel DH 120 B
 Henschel DH 180 B
 Henschel DH 240 B
 Henschel DH 360 B
 Henschel DH 500 B
 Henschel DH 120 B
 Henschel DH 120 B
 Henschel DH 120 B
 Henschel DH 120 B
 Henschel DH 360 Ca
 Henschel DH 440 Ca
 Henschel DH 500 Ca
 Henschel DH 600 Ca
 Henschel DH 700 Ci
 Henschel DH 360 D
 Henschel DH 700 D
 Henschel DH 850 D

Generation 4
 Henschel DHG 500 C
 Henschel DHG 700 C
 Henschel DHG 1000 BB
 Henschel DHG 1200 BB

Generation 5
 Henschel DHG 300 B
 Henschel DHG 700 C
 Henschel DHG 700 C-F
 Henschel DHG 800 BB
 Henschel DHG 1200 BB

Generation 6
 Henschel DHG 300 B
 Henschel DE 500 C

Esslinger
 Henschel DHG 160 B
 Henschel DHG 200 B
 Henschel DHG 240 B
 Henschel DHG 275 B
 Henschel DHG 330 C

Bundesbahn
 Henschel-BBC DE2500

Export
 Henschel DHG 625 C as SJ-Series V 4 und SJ-Series V 5
 Henschel DH 600 C for Export to Ghana and Sudan
 Henschel NY5 for the Chinese Railways
 Henschel NY6 for the Chinese Railways
 Henschel NY7 for the Chinese Railways
 Henschel DHG 2500 BB for Indian Railways as WDM-3 - 8 built 1970
 Henschel DHG 1000 BB for Perusahaan Djawatan Kereta Api/PJKA (now PT.Kereta Api Indonesia or Indonesian Railway) as BB 302 01 - BB 302 06 (built 1970) and BB 303 01 - BB 303 57 (built 1973, 1975, 1976, 1978, 1980 and 1984).
 Henschel DHG 800 BB for PJKA as BB 306 01 - BB 306 22 (built 1984 to 1986).
 Henschel AA221 for ENR (built 1978 to 1988).
 DSB Class EA for the Danish State Railways
 Série 070 a 097 for the Portuguese Railways
 Série 0181 a 0190 for the Portuguese Railways
 Série 0201 a 0224 for the Portuguese Railways
 Série 281 a 286 for the Portuguese Railways
 Série 291 a 296 for the Portuguese Railways
 Série 351 a 365 for the Portuguese Railways
 Série 501 a 508 for the Portuguese Railways
 Série 551 a 560 for the Portuguese Railways
 Série 801 a 803 for the Portuguese Railways
 Série E1 for the Portuguese Railways
 Série E141 a E144 for the Portuguese Railways
 Série E161 a E170 for the Portuguese Railways
 Série E201 a E216 for the Portuguese Railways

Notable employees
Chief Designer Erwin Aders
Dr. Herbert A. Wagner (see Henschel Hs 117, Henschel Hs 293, Henschel Hs 294, Supercavitation, Operation Paperclip)
Konrad Zuse

See also
List of RLM aircraft designations

References

<http://www.steamlocomotive.info/vlocomotive.cfm?Display=1309>

External links

Henschel's Mittelfeld Werkes Tiger tank factory
 

Defunct aircraft manufacturers of Germany
Rolling stock manufacturers of Germany
Locomotive manufacturers of Germany
Defunct bus manufacturers
Truck manufacturers of Germany
Companies based in Kassel
German brands
Defunct motor vehicle manufacturers of Germany
Trolleybus manufacturers
 
 
Bus manufacturers of Germany
Electric vehicle manufacturers of Germany
Henschel & Son